Leucoblepsis is a genus of moths belonging to the subfamily Drepaninae. The genus was erected by William Warren in 1922.

Species
Leucoblepsis excisa (Hampson, 1892)
Leucoblepsis fenestraria (Moore, [1868])
Leucoblepsis neoma (Swinhoe, 1905)
Leucoblepsis renifera (Warren, 1900)
Leucoblepsis taiwanensis Buchsbaum & Miller, 2003

References

Drepaninae
Drepanidae genera